is a Japanese freelance storyboard artist and director who has worked for Toei Animation and currently Bones. He has also sometimes used the alias .

Anime involved in

Director

TV Series

Films

Other

Alien Nine: Episode Director (episodes 1, 3, 4)
Futari wa Pretty Cure: Episode Director (episode 8)
Goldfish Warning!: Episode Director, Assistant Unit Director (episodes 1–7 odd, 8, 11–12, 15–31 odd, 35–45 odd, 50)
Mushishi: Storyboard (episodes 11, 24), Episode Director (episodes 11)
Ojamajo Doremi Na-i-sho: Episode Director (episodes 1, 5, 9, 13)
Sailor Moon: Episode Director (episodes 24, 35, 42), Assistant Episode Director

External links
 

Anime directors
Living people
1965 births